The Haga Church is a church building located in Gothenburg, Sweden. Belonging to the Gothenburg Haga Parish within the Diocese of Gothenburg of the Church of Sweden, it was opened on Advent Sunday, 27 November 1859.

Construction of the church began in 1856. The church and also the pulpit was designed by architect Adolf W. Edelsvärd.

Organs and organists
The first organ was installed in 1861 by the Danish firm Marcussen & Søn for the price of 20 000 Swedish crowns. It was rebuilt in 1911 (pneumatic action) and 1945–1951 (electric action) by the Magnusson organ building firm. It was restored to close to original condition 2002–2004 by Åkerman & Lund.

The first organist of the church was Per Johan Ållander who was hired in 1861 and the first cantor was Carl H Olsson who was hired 1863.

A meantone organ by John Brombaugh was installed in the north balcony in 1991–1992.

References

External links

 information from the Gothenburg Haga Parish  

Churches in Gothenburg
Churches in the Diocese of Gothenburg
19th-century Church of Sweden church buildings
Churches completed in 1859
1859 establishments in Sweden
Gothic Revival church buildings in Sweden